Barnicle is a surname. Notable people with the surname include:

George Barnicle (1917–1990), American baseball player
Mary Elizabeth Barnicle (1891–1978), American folklorist, Medieval English literature professor, and activist
Mike Barnicle (born 1943), American print and broadcast journalist, and social and political commentator

See also
Barnacle (surname)